The Sixth Doctor comic stories is a range of off-screen adventures featuring the sixth incarnation of the Doctor, the protagonist of the hit sci-fi series Doctor Who. Continuing the themes of the televised series, every story sees the Doctor travelling to a new destination and fighting evil and righting wrongs.

History
DWM launched the Sixth Doctor's comic strip adventures with the Doctor travelling on his own. His first story introduced a new companion, Frobisher — the shape-changing Whifferdill who often assumed the form of a penguin. Image rights were later obtained for Nicola Bryant, which allowed Peri to become the first humanoid televised companion regularly used in the pages of DWM. The writers even went to the trouble of trying to explain her earlier absence. Apparently, she took time away from the TARDIS to explore New York City. Since she remained the companion up to the final story of the regular run, the 1980s Sixth Doctor comics all happened somewhere between The Twin Dilemma and Mindwarp.
 
Because the Sixth Doctor's era began at the end of season 21, and the Seventh Doctor's DWM start was delayed by Grant Morrison's epic death-of-Jamie McCrimmon story line, the Sixth Doctor's regular era in DWM comics contains significantly more stories than his televised run. Moreover, he has a few additional stories which were published after Colin Baker was no longer incumbent in the role.
 
Nevertheless, the Sixth Doctor has one of the briefer comic canons of all the Doctors, with only the Fifth Doctor and Ninth Doctor appearing in fewer total comic stories.

Comics

Doctor Who Magazine

Graphic novels

Short stories

Doctor Who annuals

See also
 List of Doctor Who comic stories
 First Doctor comic stories
 Second Doctor comic stories
 Third Doctor comic stories
 Fourth Doctor comic strips
 Fifth Doctor comic stories
 Seventh Doctor comic stories
 Eighth Doctor comic stories
 War Doctor comic stories
 Ninth Doctor comic stories
 Tenth Doctor comic stories
 Eleventh Doctor comic stories
 Twelfth Doctor comic stories

Comics based on Doctor Who
Sixth Doctor stories